Aaron Russo (February 14, 1943 – August 24, 2007) was an American entertainment businessman, film producer and director, and political activist. He was best known for producing movies including Trading Places, Wise Guys, and The Rose. Later in life, he created various libertarian-leaning political documentaries including Mad as Hell and America: Freedom to Fascism.

After a six-year period with cancer, Russo died on August 24, 2007.

Early life
Russo was born in Brooklyn, New York, to a Jewish family. Growing up on Long Island, Russo worked for his family's undergarment business.

In 2004, he declared his candidacy for the Libertarian Party's presidential nomination. Although he received the first and second ballot, Russo ultimately lost the nomination to Michael Badnarik.

Entertainment career
In April 1968, Russo opened the nightclub Kinetic Playground in Chicago, Illinois, originally naming it the Electric Theater.  He booked numerous prominent rock groups and musicians at the club such as The Grateful Dead, Iron Butterfly, Jefferson Airplane, Janis Joplin, Led Zeppelin, King Crimson, Vanilla Fudge, Rotary Connection, and The Who.

In addition to owning his own nightclub, Russo managed several musical acts throughout the 1970s including The Manhattan Transfer and Bette Midler.

Russo then moved into producing and directing movies, six of them receiving Academy Award nominations and two receiving Golden Globe Award nominations. His first producing credit was for Midler's Clams on the Half-Shell Revue. Other notable feature films he produced include The Rose (1979), starring Midler, and also Trading Places (1983), starring Eddie Murphy and Dan Aykroyd. His final film would be America: Freedom to Fascism, a political documentary critical of the Internal Revenue Service and the Federal Reserve System and warning about the coming of the New World Order.

In 1987, Aaron Russo had set up its own entertainment company, Aaron Russo Entertainment with self-financing up to $86 million in coin to aid for the prospecting for film, TV and music properties and it was a Delaware corporation that was based in New York, and gave them a capital of $62 million for production of 6-to-10 films each budgeted at $5 million, which is maximum of $15 million, and gains agreements with Vestron Inc. for US home video rights, the Rank Organization (previous position held by Producers Sales Organization, prior to bankruptcy) gave them foreign rights to all media and US syndication and pay cable rights going to HBO, so they would not have to disclose the participants' contributions to the production kitty, and all of the ARE productions were gone to Orion Pictures for the U.S. and Canada theatrical rights. He then named Irwin Russo as senior vice president of the Los Angeles-based Aaron Russo Films and the company had set up feature projects by 1988, with record division Aaron Russo Films and Aaron Russo Television set to follow.

Political career
Russo became involved in political issues in the mid-1990s when he produced and starred in the documentary entitled Mad As Hell in which he criticized the North American Free Trade Agreement (NAFTA), the federal government's War on Drugs, the concept of a National Identity Card, and government regulation of alternative medicine.

In 1998, Russo took his political interests to a higher level, running for governor of the state of Nevada as a Republican.  Placing second in the Republican primary with 26% of the vote to candidate Kenny Guinn, Russo later endorsed the Democratic nominee, then-Las Vegas mayor Jan Laverty Jones, who would eventually lose to Guinn. Russo was planning to run again for Nevada governor in 2002 as either an independent or Libertarian, but was sidelined by cancer.

In January 2004, Russo declared his candidacy for the President of the United States initially as an independent, but then as a Libertarian.  At the Libertarian National Convention in May 2004, Russo received 258 votes to Michael Badnarik's 256 votes and Gary Nolan's 246 votes, short of the majority required to receive the presidential nomination.  Russo would eventually lose the nomination on the convention's third and final ballot to Badnarik by a vote of 423–344.

Death
On August 24, 2007, Russo died at the age of 64 of cancer at Cedars-Sinai Medical Center in Los Angeles.

Filmography
He was a producer in all films unless otherwise noted.

Film

As director

As an actor

Music department

Television

References

External links
 America: Freedom to Fascism, Russo's last film
 
 Virtual Memorial
 

American entertainment industry businesspeople
American documentary filmmakers
Film producers from New York (state)
People from Brooklyn
20th-century American Jews
People from the Las Vegas Valley
1943 births
2007 deaths
Nevada Libertarians
Nevada Republicans
Activists from New York (state)
Deaths from cancer in California
21st-century American Jews